Mountelgonia arcifera is a moth of the family Cossidae. It is found in southern Kenya and north-central Tanzania. The habitat consists of open grasslands with shrubs and/or trees at medium to high elevations.

The wingspan is about 24 mm for males and 26.5 mm for females. The forewings are ivory yellow, the costal margin warm buff. The hindwings are glossy ivory yellow, with slightly darker veins.

References

Moths described in 1909
Mountelgonia
Moths of Africa